Southern Connecticut State University (Southern Connecticut, Southern Connecticut State, SCSU, or simply Southern) is a public university in New Haven, Connecticut. Part of the Connecticut State University System, it was founded in 1893 and is governed by the Connecticut Board of Regents for Higher Education.

History 
On September 11, 1893, New Haven State Normal School, a two-year teacher training school,  was established. The Skinner School, a two-story building, was used as the first campus. It was situated on State Street at the corner of what was then known as Summer Street. Arthur Boothby Morrill served as the first principal of the Normal School from 1893 to 1924. Two female teachers and Morrill made up the faculty. Prospective students had to be at least 16 years of age, and typically had either a three year high school degree or two years teaching experience. There were 85 women in the first class. Tuition was free for students, in-state or out-of-state, as long as a declaration to complete their studies and teach in Connecticut was signed. All textbook materials were provided by the school. Boarding was available for between $3.50 and $4.00 a week, although the majority of the students were from New Haven and commuted.

The Skinner School was soon outgrown by the rapidly growing Normal School. In 1896, it was moved to a new building on Howe and Oak St. This was a better location because of its larger size and its proximity to several elementary schools where students could train. At this point, the Normal School could only award certificates in teaching to graduates.

By 1937 the school was able to grant bachelor's degrees, and thus renamed New Haven State Teacher's College. Graduate degrees were offered starting in 1954, a year after the school moved to its current campus on Crescent St.

New Haven State Teacher's College became Southern Connecticut State College in 1959. In March 1983 the school was renamed Southern Connecticut State University and made part of the Connecticut State University System.

Campus 
Southern has one campus located at 501 Crescent Street, in New Haven, bordering parts of Hamden, Connecticut. Fitch Street separates the academic and residential sections of the campus. The School of Business was moved to the renovated former student center in mid-2012. The building houses meeting rooms, offices for faculty, and trading rooms. As part of an effort to expand on the university's science programs, the laboratory science building was opened in 2015. The four-story building specializes with cancer research, physics and optics, along with other fields of sciences.

Academics

Rankings
 121 in Regional Universities North by U.S. News & World Report in 2020.

Teacher Education 
Southern Connecticut State University remains a center for teacher education. Southern is the only school in Connecticut to offer a master's degree concentration in autism spectrum disorders. The university received approval for its first doctoral program, an Ed.D. in Educational Leadership.

Nursing 
NCLEX passing rates for Southern students hover between 90 and 100 percent in the past three decades.

Liberal Education Program 
The LEP program consists of electives, and is a requirement for all majors. This program is meant to expose students to different types of classes outside side of their major. It is broken up into three tiers of classes and accounts for 42 credits of a student's degree.  Tier one includes Inquiry 101, Writing 102 and a couple other basic classes that are geared towards Freshmen.  It also requires completion of a 200 level language course in any of 10 languages, including American Sign Language.  Tier two is broken into 9 categories.  Students are required to take one class for each category.  The categories include American Experience, Cultural Expression, Creative Drive, Global Awareness, Mind and Body, Natural World I and II, Social Structure, and Time and Place.  Tier Three is considered a "Capstone" and only one class is taken.  Generally a student's major requires a 300 or 400 level course in the major to complete this capstone.  Every major is required to take 3 W or written intensive courses before graduating.

Student life

Greek life 
There are many Greek-lettered social organizations on campus. Each organization strives for the betterment of students. Each organization is unique in its make-up, beliefs, and traditions.

Here is a list of the fraternities and sororities that are active or inactive on campus.

Library 
Southern Connecticut State University's Hilton C. Buley Library was named after Hilton C. Buley, the president of the New Haven State Teachers College which was a former name of the institution, from July 1, 1954, to February 18, 1971. He was an educator and administrator in New York, New Jersey, and Wisconsin prior to earning a doctorate degree from Columbia University. He served as an administrator in the New Hampshire public schools before joining Southern.

The first library was housed at 2 Howe Street, New Haven, the original home of the university which was then called New Haven Normal School and consisted of a reading room with two walls of wooden bookshelves and a stack area in the balcony on the third wall. When the school opened in 1893, the library contained 500 books.  By 1950 a collection of over 28,000 books and 200 periodical subscriptions was crammed into the space which was originally intended for 10,000 volumes. The library's move to the main building on Crescent Street, Engleman Hall, was accomplished in 1954 shortly before Buley came to Southern. By the year 1969 it contained over 200,000 volumes and was outgrowing its space yet again.

The dedication ceremony of a new Hilton C. Buley Library was held on October 31, 1970, a few months prior to the president's retirement.  The library could hold up to 500,000 volumes with flexible space that could accommodate an equal number of additional volumes. However, as the library's collections kept growing, space was a major concern. When funding for a new addition and renovation to the existing library was approved by the legislature, a building planning committee was formed in 1999 with a new library building finally opening in March 2014.

The current library features four Tiffany Windows. Louis C. Tiffany (1848-1933), one of America's most talented and renowned artists best known for his work in stained glass, created these beautiful pieces. Three of these, "Angel of Praise", "Water Brooks", and "Hector" are located on the south side of the Learning Commons area just behind the Reference Desk in large boxes to be viewed against natural light. These were donated to the university in the sixties from the First Center Church of Christ in New Haven. A fourth window, the "Congregational window", was donated by the Congregational Church in the 1990s and is currently displayed in the second floor reading room. The windows were installed in the old library in 1972 but just before the building was renovated they were removed, restored by Serpentino Stained Glass Studio, and kept in storage till they were ready to be displayed.

The Water Brooks window (1898-1904) was created in memory of Ezekiel Hayes Trowbridge, a descendant of one of the founders of the Church, and is 54" wide and 98" high. The Hector, which was designed in 1898, is the ship which transported the early colonist to New Haven in 1638. The four corners of the window contain the four meeting houses of the congregation dated 1640, 1670, 1757, and 1814.

Library holdings include the Carolyn Sherwin Bailey's Collection of Children's Literature, Helen Liveten Juvenile Collection, William Cahn Labor Collection, Connecticut Collection, Eula H. Davies Napoleonica Collection, A.H. Gosselin Sound Collection, David Libbey Collection of Library Postcards, Edward G. Levy collection of Nineteenth Century Textbooks and Ephemera, Sherman Reilly Collection of Tracts, and the Artists' Book Collection. The university's digital collections include American Publishers' Binding, 1829–1975; Connecticut Libraries, the newsletter of the Connecticut Library Association; Connecticut Women's Hall of Fame containing samples of ephemera owned by women who belonged to the Hall of Fame; and the Libbey Library Postcard Collection consisting of over 1,400 library postcards donated by Dr. David Libbey, professor emeritus.

Sustainability 
On May 30, 2019, Southern officially declared a "Climate Emergency" after recent student advocacy and Faculty from the Department of the Environment, Geography and Marine Sciences advocating for the university to take stronger action in addressing climate change. This makes Southern the first university in the U.S. to make such a declaration.

Athletics

Notable alumni 

 Timothy I. Ahern – U.S. Air Force general
 Tony Amendola – actor
Kevin Anderson – head men's soccer coach at Columbia University
Joe Andruzzi – professional American football player
 Lynn Austin – Christy Award-winning author
John Ball – professional soccer player
Brian Bliss – professional soccer player
Dorinda Keenan Borer – Connecticut State Representative
Steve Bush – professional American football player
Jacques Cesaire – professional American football player
Jerome Cunningham - professional American football player
John DeBrito – professional soccer player
Warren Doyle – Appalachian Trail hiker, supporter, and speed hiker.
James Economou – professional American football player
Anthony Fantano – host of The Needle Drop music program, famous music critic YouTuber
Ancil Farrier – professional soccer player
Kaliegh Garris –  Miss Connecticut Teen USA and Miss Teen USA 2019
Dave Gettleman – professional American football general manager
Ficre Ghebreyesus – Eritrean-American painter
Beverly Morrison Glennon – author, teacher, and historian
Kevin Gilbride – Head Coach of the New York Guardians
Marilyn Giuliano – Connecticut State Representative
Tim Holt – college and professional football coach
Rep. Jahana Hayes – Congresswoman for Connecticut's 5th district
Chris Houser – professional soccer player
Cathy Inglese – collegiate basketball coach
Gilbert Jean-Baptiste – professional soccer player
 Mike Katz – professional bodybuilder and NFL player for the New York Jets
George Kiefer – head men's soccer coach at the North Carolina State University
Dan Lauria – actor
James Marshall – author and illustrator
Bonaventure Maruti – professional soccer player
Nangolo Mbumba – Namibian politician
Scott Mersereau – former defensive end for the New York Jets
Nick Nicolau – college and professional American football coach
Olivier Occéan – professional soccer player
Andrew Olivieri – professional soccer player
Bo Oshoniyi – professional soccer player
Juan Carlos Osorio – professional soccer player
Paul Oyuga – professional soccer player
Chris Palmer – professional American football coach
Henry E. Parker – Connecticut State Treasurer (1975–1986)
Rob Parker – professional television journalist
Mike Petke – professional soccer player
Neil Thomas Proto – lawyer, teacher, lecturer, and author
Ray Reid – head men's soccer coach at the University of Connecticut
Carlos Rocha – professional soccer player
Jordan Russolillo – professional soccer player
John Searles – author, book critic, and editor-at-large at Cosmopolitan magazine
Cristian da Silva – professional soccer player
Parrish Smith – musician
Victoria Leigh Soto – teacher, murdered in the Sandy Hook Elementary School shooting
Erik Stocklin – American actor
Jeff Stoutland – professional American football coach
Andy Talley – Former Villanova University head football coach
Daniel Trust – Rwandan genocide survivor, motivational speaker
Travis Tucker – former tight end for the Cleveland Browns
Toni Walker - Connecticut State Representative 
Norby Williamson – ESPN vice president of studio and remote production
Gary Winfield - Connecticut State Senator, former State Representative

References

External links 
 
 SCSU Athletics Website

 
Education in New Haven, Connecticut
Public universities and colleges in Connecticut
Educational institutions established in 1893
Buildings and structures in New Haven, Connecticut
Universities and colleges in New Haven County, Connecticut
Tourist attractions in New Haven, Connecticut
1893 establishments in Connecticut